Szymon Salski (born September 13, 1990) is a Polish footballer who plays for ŁKS Łódź.

External links 
 

Polish footballers
1990 births
ŁKS Łódź players
Living people
Place of birth missing (living people)
Association football defenders